Destiny is a 1951 Italian melodrama film directed by Enzo Di Gianni and starring Eva Nova, Renato Valente and Lilia Landi.

The film's sets were designed by Enzo Trapani.

Cast
 Eva Nova as Elena Martini
 Renato Valente as Bruno
 Lilia Landi as Sonia
 Mario Vitale as Franco Borielli
 Agostino Salvietti as Papa' Ciocchetti
 Loris Gizzi as Filippo Borcello
 Michele Malaspina as L'avvocato Giorgio Bariello
 Tina Pica as Nunziata
 Amedeo Trilli as Il frate
 Giulia Lazzarini as Anna Maria
 Domenico Modugno as Turiddu
 Silvana Muzi as L'infermiera
 Salvatore Furnari  as Il nano Sansone

References

Bibliography

External links

Destiny at Variety Distribution

1951 films
1951 drama films
Italian drama films
1950s Italian-language films
Films directed by Enzo Di Gianni
Films set in Naples
Melodrama films
Italian black-and-white films
1950s Italian films